Trakų Street (literally, "Trakai Street") is one of the oldest streets in the Vilnius Old Town.

Gallery

References

Streets in Vilnius